Section 8 is a fictional comic book team of superheroes appearing in books published by DC Comics. Created by writer Garth Ennis and artists John McCrea and Steve Dillon, the team first appeared in Hitman #18 (September 1997). The team is named after the military designation for "mentally unfit for duty".

History
The team is based in The Cauldron, the Irish section of Gotham City, and is led by Sixpack. They apparently have some sort of heroic history (though this is questionable, owing to the fact that several of their members seem prone to complicated hallucinations) prior to the events of Hitman. The team is headquartered on an artificial island in a sewer, however they are shown to have relocated to Noonan’s Sleazy Bar as of the events in Sixpack and Dogwelder; Hard Travellin’ Heroez. As of the start of the series, the team is split up, although they are all still located within Gotham City. Friendly Fire, Shakes, and Jean de Baton-Baton had retired; the Defenestrator was in Arkham Asylum after throwing a cop through the same window fourteen times; Dogwelder and Flemgem were still stalking the streets of Gotham; Sixpack was a regular at Noonan's Sleazy Bar, believing his drunken dreams of superhero work were real.

The team reforms to provide critical support for Tommy Monaghan and his crew during the "Ace of Killers" storyline. Collectively, they kill many mafia soldiers that were trying to kill Tommy, Natt the Hat, Detective Tiegel and Catwoman. The group later aids Tommy during his encounter with the Czarnian mercenary anti-hero Lobo. Specifically, they aid Tommy in creating material blackmailing a stunned Lobo with the help of Bueno Excellente which prevents Lobo from taking revenge against any of them. Sixpack makes several solo appearances in Hitman as comic relief and an ally in some battles.

In their next appearance, the team was starting to split up again after Friendly Fire pointed out how pathetic they were and that all they did was meet once a month and achieve nothing. Sixpack is left distraught when Friendly Fire points out, in anger, that all his 'superhero' missions are just drunken dreams. However, when the demonic Multi-Angled Ones arose in Gotham, Section 8 rallied to fight them. Their attempt was completely unsuccessful: most of the team die or accidentally kill themselves. The Many-Angled Ones become interested in Sixpack when the flames from an explosion don't touch him, and when he tells them that he'd be willing to die standing against them because "that's what superheroes do". The demons are left amused and a deal is made where Sixpack will leave with them and try to battle against them for his own soul, in exchange for leaving Earth alone.

Sixpack has a statue built in a park in his honor of his sacrifice (a parody of the end of Whatever Happened to the Man of Tomorrow?), though he is shown still alive (and sane) in New York City at an Alcoholics Anonymous meeting, implying that his "battle for his soul" is facing his addiction to alcohol. Bueno Excellente survived the battle as well and avenges their loss on the scientist responsible for releasing the Many Angled Ones.

In June 2015, DC began publishing "All-Star Section Eight", by Ennis and McCrea.

When Sixpack has a near-death experience, the Phantom Stranger reveals that the dead members of Section Eight were sent to Limbo, with the exception of Dogwelder, who was apparently condemned to Hell because, "he welded dogs to people, for ******'s sake!"

Later, in 2016, a limited series was ran, titled “Sixpack and Dogwelder; Hard Travellin’ Heroez”, starring section eight in a mission to save the world. It included other DC characters such as the Spectre, John Constantine, and introduced new members to Section Eight; Baytor and Guts. On top of this, it featured the newly-replaced Dogwelder who, as shown in All star section eight, is the predecessor to the Dogwelder once on the team. The team saves the world with the help of John Constantine, travelling to Sirius, the Dog Star, in order to weld it with its dwarf to stop a world-ending collision. Dogwelder is sacrificed during this process.

Members
Sixpack: Team leader, whose special ability is grotesque drunkenness and beating villains with broken-off liquor bottles; he talks in a stream of comic clichés. He thinks he is a real superhero and does not seem to realise that all his superheroic encounters are just drunken dreams, and gets upset when he's told they are not real. A regular at Noonan's Sleazy Bar, he fights against the vampires in No Man's Land and at the Battle of Noonan's Bar in "The Old Dog".
Bueno Excellente: An obese, sweaty, and bald Latino in an overcoat who "defeats evil with the power of perversion". Generally, the only things he says are "Bueno" or "Excellente", often preceded by a creepy chuckle. That Stupid Bastich reveals that he has a career in porn films. He has also become a small internet meme and in the two-issue miniseries JLA/Hitman it is revealed that Bueno Excellente had apparently date-raped Kyle Rayner by slipping something into his drink. This is only mentioned in passing as Kyle does not remember the incident.
The Defenestrator: A large, burly man in a denim jacket, black sunglasses, with black hair who obsessively carries around a window through which he forcefully throws criminals and the occasional unlucky policeman. His assaults on police officers landed him in Arkham Asylum. His appearance, name, and his death (and last words) are direct parodies of Arnold Schwarzenegger's character in Terminator 2: Judgment Day.
Dogwelder: A thin, silent man in a welder's mask who spot welds dead canines to evildoers. When Sixpack tries to bring him back to the team, Dogwelder almost welds him on general instinct.
Friendly Fire: A large, hapless man in a red cowl, Friendly Fire would easily be the most powerful of Section 8's heroes if he were to shoot anything other than allies with the potent bolts of energy he fires from his hands. He is the most defeatist member of the team and the only one who will state how pathetic the team is (though he apologises to Sixpack for revealing the truth), but he still wore his costume even in retirement. He blew his own head off when trying his hardest to shoot the right target.
Jean de Baton-Baton: A bizarrely gaunt walking French caricature who defeats enemies with "the power of Frenchness", as expressed by savage beatings with a baguette and occasionally blinding others with rings of garlic and onions.
Flemgem: A sickly, thin, bald man in a green suit and a purple domino mask who has the ability to produce and expel large volumes of phlegm, which can blind, suffocate, or simply disgust evildoers.
Shakes: A thin, hairy vagrant who upsets people through stutters and an overall shaking palsy. He is a frequent accidental target of Friendly Fire. He dies trying to take out the Many-Angled Ones, when he grabs a grenade and runs to a petrol station.

Following Sixpack's accidental return to alcoholism, he assembles a new Section 8 to combat a mysterious (and possibly imagined) threat. Sixpack convinces Bueno Excellente to reenlist, brings in five new members, and attempts to fill the vacant eighth position with someone from the Justice League.

Guts: A sentient entanglement of disembodied internal organs who vaguely takes the form of a human, Guts shows no apparent super-human abilities other than her abstract form. She’s married to Bueno (despite his constant adultery), but has been shown to engage in relations with John Constantine. 
Baytor: A demon who works as a barman and caretaker at Noonan’s Sleazy Bar, he is described by The Spectre to be the demon lord of the criminally insane, king of hell (for a very brief period of time), ally of the arch-fiend Etrigan and an escapee from the infernal regions.
Dogwelder II: Predecessor to the original Dogwelder of section eight, Dogwelder II is an African-American man who had the misfortune of donning the Dogwelder tools after purchasing them from a pawn shop. The tools became stuck to him and transformed him into the next Dogwelder, giving him the compulsion to weld dogs to the faces of enemies. He’s shown to be the first Dogwelder to harness the power of his ancestors and use the dogs for more than just welding, instead using them not only to talk, but to eventually save the universe.
 The Grapplah!: A man with grappling hooks and guns who is also "an annoying tool who won't shut his stupid mouth".
 Powertool: A rational, construction-themed vigilante with a drill in his helmet's faceplate.

In other media
 James Gunn mentioned on Twitter that he considered to have Dogwelder in The Suicide Squad but did not feel the character should be expressed cinematically. During production of the film, fans petitioned to have Dogwelder in it, with McCrea giving his support for it.

References

External links
DCU Guide: Section 8
Cosmic Teams: Section 8
Dogwelder cited as one of Comic Book Resources' "Reasons To Love Comics"
 "The Top Ten Lamest Superheroes of All Time" from PopCultureAddict.com (#6, Dogwelder)

1997 comics debuts
DC Comics superhero teams
Internet memes
Characters created by Garth Ennis